Jelsa is a former municipality in Rogaland county, Norway.  The  municipality existed from 1838 until 1965. It encompassed area that surrounds the Sandsfjorden in the present-day municipalities of Suldal, Hjelmeland, and Stavanger. The administrative centre was the village of Jelsa, where Jelsa Church is located.

History
The parish of Jælse was established as a municipality on 1 January 1838 (see formannskapsdistrikt law). In 1859, the municipality was split, with the northern district becoming the municipality of Sand.  The split left Jelsa with a population of 2,606. On 1 January 1914, the eastern district was split off as the new municipality of Erfjord. This left Jelsa with 1,539 residents.

On 1 January 1965 the municipality of Jelsa was dissolved due to recommendations by the Schei Committee.  The majority of Jelsa (population: 928) was merged with the municipalities of Erfjord, Sand, and Suldal to form a new, enlarged Suldal Municipality. At the same time, the Buergårdene area (population: 8) on the island of Ombo was moved to Hjelmeland Municipality, and the rest of the island of Ombo that belonged to Jelsa (population: 89) was moved to Finnøy Municipality.

Government
All municipalities in Norway, including Jelsa, are responsible for primary education (through 10th grade), outpatient health services, senior citizen services, unemployment and other social services, zoning, economic development, and municipal roads.  The municipality is governed by a municipal council of elected representatives, which in turn elects a mayor.

Municipal council
The municipal council  of Jelsa was made up of 17 representatives that were elected to four year terms.  The party breakdown of the final municipal council was as follows:

See also
List of former municipalities of Norway

References

Suldal
Hjelmeland
Stavanger
Former municipalities of Norway
1838 establishments in Norway
1965 disestablishments in Norway